Virilastacus araucanius is a burrowing species of crayfish in the family Parastacidae, endemic to Chile.

Conservation status 
Virilastacus araucanius is listed as Data Deficient by the IUCN.

References 

Cambaridae
Crustaceans described in 1914
Taxa named by Walter Faxon
Endemic fauna of Chile